Fleetwood Mac are a British-American rock band originally formed in London. Formed in July 1967, the group originally consisted of lead guitarist and vocalist Peter Green, slide guitarist and vocalist Jeremy Spencer, bassist Bob Brunning and drummer Mick Fleetwood. The band's current lineup includes Fleetwood, bassist John McVie (since September 1967), vocalist Stevie Nicks (from December 1974 to December 1990, and since March 1997), lead guitarist Mike Campbell and rhythm guitarist, keyboardist and vocalist Neil Finn (both since April 2018).

History

1967–1973
Fleetwood Mac are a British-American rock band, originally formed in London. After leaving John Mayall & the Bluesbreakers, guitarist and vocalist Peter Green and drummer Mick Fleetwood formed Fleetwood Mac in July 1967 with slide guitarist Jeremy Spencer and bassist Bob Brunning. In September, Brunning was replaced by John McVie, Green and Fleetwood's original choice for the role. Danny Kirwan was added as a third guitarist following the release of Mr. Wonderful in August 1968. Green suddenly left the band in 1970 due to problems with drug abuse and mental health issues, playing his last show with the band on 20 May. McVie's wife Christine – who had collaborated with the band multiple times – joined on keyboards and vocals shortly after Green's departure, officially becoming a member in August.

During a United States tour in February 1971, Spencer departed Fleetwood Mac after leaving the band's Los Angeles hotel and not returning; it was later revealed that he had joined the Children of God organisation. Green temporarily returned to take Spencer's place on the tour, with Bob Welch joining after its conclusion. Kirwan was fired by Fleetwood in August 1972, after he got into a drunken argument with Welch backstage, injured himself, broke his guitar and refused to perform. He was replaced by Bob Weston the following month, when vocalist Dave Walker also joined the band. Walker had left by June the following year, shortly after the release of Penguin. Weston stayed to perform on its follow-up Mystery to Me later in the year, but was fired in October after having an affair with Fleetwood's wife Jenny Boyd Fleetwood.

1974 onwards
After spending much of the year involved in a legal dispute with former manager Clifford Davis, the four-piece Fleetwood Mac returned in late 1974 with Heroes Are Hard to Find. By the end of the year Welch had left the band, with his replacement Lindsey Buckingham joining on New Year's Eve 1974 with his girlfriend, vocalist Stevie Nicks. This lineup of the band remained constant for over twelve years and multiple successful releases, before Buckingham left in August 1987. He was replaced by two guitarists: Billy Burnette and Rick Vito. Nicks and Christine McVie both retired from the touring lineup of the band after the last show of the Behind the Mask Tour on 7 December 1990, although McVie contributed to recordings for the band's next studio album Time in 1995. Vito also left the band in October 1991.

The 1974–1987 lineup of Fleetwood Mac reunited for a performance at Bill Clinton's inauguration on 20 January 1993. Nicks and Burnette left the band shortly thereafter, with Bekka Bramlett and Dave Mason, respectively, replacing the departed members later in the year. Both performed on 1995's Time, which also featured a returning Burnette on guitar. Shortly after the album was released in October, Fleetwood Mac disbanded. Within a year, however, the band had returned with a lineup including Nicks, Buckingham, the McVies and Fleetwood. They returned to touring in 1997, releasing the live album The Dance in August, before Christine McVie left again in 1998 and all but retired from music. She ultimately returned to Fleetwood Mac sixteen years later in January 2014.

In April 2018, Buckingham was fired from Fleetwood Mac after a disagreement over touring; he was replaced by two guitarists, Mike Campbell and Neil Finn.

Members

Current

Former

Touring

Timeline

Official

Touring

Lineups

References

External links
Fleetwood Mac official website

Fleetwood Mac